The Cork–Offaly rivalry is a hurling rivalry between Cork and Offaly. The fixture is an irregular one due to both teams playing in separate provinces.

Roots

History

For the first one hundred-year history of the Gaelic Athletic Association, Cork and Offaly never crossed paths in the championship. Offaly, regarded as one of the minnows of hurling, failed to emerge from the Leinster series until 1980 while the absence of a "back door system" or expanded qualifiers series meant that a championship meeting between the two teams was unlikely.

The centenary year All-Ireland final was a unique occasion as it provided the first ever championship clash between Cork and Offaly. Since then the sides have met at irregular intervals in All-Ireland semi-finals and, most recently, in the All-Ireland qualifiers.

Statistics

All-time results

References

External links
 GAA Hurling All-Ireland Qualifiers Phase 2

Offaly
Offaly county hurling team rivalries